Maitreyi ("Wise one") was an Indian philosopher who lived during the later Vedic period in ancient India. She is mentioned in the Brihadaranyaka Upanishad as one of two wives of the Vedic sage Yajnavalkya; she is estimated to have lived around the 8th century BCE. In the Hindu epic Mahabharata and the Gṛhyasūtras, however, Maitreyi is described as an Advaita philosopher who never married.  In ancient Sanskrit literature, she is known as a brahmavadini (an expounder of the Veda).

Maitreyi appears in ancient Indian texts, such as in a dialogue where she explores the Hindu concept of Atman (soul or self) in a dialogue with Yajnavalkya in the Brihadaranyaka Upanishad. According to this dialogue, love is driven by a person's soul, and Maitreyi discusses the nature of Atman and Brahman and their unity, the core of Advaita philosophy. This Maitreyi-Yajnavalkya dialogue is the topic of Sureshvara's varttika, a commentary.

Maitreyi is cited as an example of the educational opportunities available to women in Vedic India, and their philosophical achievements. She is considered a symbol of Indian intellectual women, and an institution is named in her honour in New Delhi.

Early life

In the Asvalayana Gṛhyasūtra, the daughter of the sage Maitri is referred to as Sulabha Maitreyi and is mentioned in the Gṛhyasūtras with several other women scholars of the Vedic era. Her father, who lived in the Kingdom of the Videhas, Mithila, was a minister in the court of King Janaka.

Although Maitreyi of ancient India, described as an Advaita philosopher, is said to be a wife of the sage Yajnavalkya in the Brihadaranyaka Upanishad in the time of Janaka, the Hindu epic Mahabharata states Sulabha Maitreyi is a young beauty who never marries. In the latter, Maitreyi explains Advaita philosophy (monism) to Janaka and is described as a lifelong ascetic. She is called as a brahmavadini (a female expounder of the Veda) in ancient Sanskrit literature. Maitreyi and Yajnavalkya are estimated to have lived around the 8th century BCE.

In the Brihadaranyaka Upanishad, Maitreyi is described as Yajnavalkya's scholarly wife; his other wife, Katyayani, was a housewife. While Yajnavalkya and Katyayani lived in contented domesticity, Maitreyi studied metaphysics and engaged in theological dialogues with her husband in addition to "making self-inquiries of introspection".

Maitreyi-Yajnavalkya dialogue
In the Rigveda about ten hymns are attributed to Maitreyi. She explores the Hindu concept of Atman (soul or self) in a dialogue contained in the Brihadaranyaka Upanishad. The dialogue, also called the Maitreyi-Yajnavalkya dialogue, states that love is driven by a person's soul, and it discusses the nature of Atman and Brahman and their unity, the core of Advaita philosophy.

This dialogue appears in several Hindu texts; the earliest is in chapter 2.4 – and modified in chapter 4.5 – of the Brihadaranyaka Upanishad, one of the principal and oldest Upanishads, dating from approximately 700 BCE. The Maitreyi-Yajnavalkya dialogue has survived in two manuscript recensions from the Madhyamdina and Kanva Vedic schools; although they have significant literary differences, they share the same philosophical theme.

After Yajnavalkya achieved success in the first three stages of his life – brahmacharya (as a student), grihastha (with his family) and vanaprastha (in retirement) – he wished to become a sannyasi (a renunciant) in his old age. He asked Maitreyi for permission, telling her that he wanted to divide his assets between her and Katyayani. Maitreyi said that she was not interested in wealth, since it would not make her "immortal", but wanted to learn about immortality:

In the dialogue which follows, Yajnavalkya explains his views on immortality in Atman (soul), Brahman (ultimate reality) and their equivalence. Maitreyi objects to parts of Yajnavalkya's explanation, and requests clarification.

Scholars have differing views on whether this dialogue is evidence that in ancient Vedic tradition women were accepted as active participants in spiritual discussions and as scholars of Brahman. Wendy Doniger, an Indologist and a professor of History of Religions, states that in this dialogue Maitreyi is not portrayed as an author, but is part of an Upanishadic story of a Brahmin with two wives who are distinguished by their intellect. Karen Pechelis, another American Indologist and a professor of Comparative Religion, in contrast, states that Maitreyi is portrayed as theologically minded, as she challenges Yajnavalkya in this dialogue and asks the right questions.

First-millennium Indian scholars, such as Sureshvara (Suresvaracharya, c. 750 CE), have viewed this male-female dialogue as profound on both sides; Maitreyi refuses wealth, wishing to share her husband's spiritual knowledge, and in the four known versions of the Upanishadic story she challenges Yajnavalkya's theory of Atman. Yajnavalkya acknowledges her motivations, and that her questions are evidence she is a seeker of ultimate knowledge and a lover of the Atman.

The Maitreyi dialogue in the Upanishad is significant beyond being a gage of gender relations. Adi Shankara, a scholar of the influential Advaita Vedanta school of Hindu philosophy, wrote in his Brihadaranyakopanishad bhashya that the purpose of the Maitreyi-Yajnavalkya dialogue in chapter 2.4 of the Brihadaranyaka Upanishad is to highlight the importance of the knowledge of Atman and Brahman, and to understand their oneness. According to Shankara, the dialogue suggests renunciation is prescribed in the Sruti (vedic texts of Hinduism), as a means to knowledge of the Brahman and Atman. He adds, that the pursuit of self-knowledge is considered important in the Sruti because the Maitreyi dialogue is repeated in chapter 4.5 as a "logical finale" to the discussion of Brahman in the Upanishad.

Nature of love
The Maitreyi-Yajnavalkya dialogue includes a discussion of love and the essence of whom one loves, suggesting that love is a connection of the soul and the universal self (related to an individual):

According to theological author and editor Robert Van De Weyer, this asserts that all love is a reflection of one's own soul: parents' love of their children, a love of religion or of the entire world. German Indologist and Oxford University professor Max Müller says that the love described in the Maitreyi-Yajnavalkya dialogue of the Brihadaranyaka Upanishad extends to all aspects of one's life and beyond; in verse 2.4.5, "The Devas (gods) are not dear to one out of love for gods, but because one may love the Self (Atman) that the gods are dear". In the dialogue "the Brahman-class, the Kshatra-class, these worlds, these gods, these beings, everything that is what this Soul is", and when "we see, hear, perceive and know the Self, then all is known".

Concluding his dialogue on the "inner self", or soul, Yajnavalkaya tells Maitreyi:

After Yajnavalkya leaves and becomes a sannyasi, Maitreyi becomes a sannyassini – she too wanders and leads a renunciate's life.

Legacy

Maitreyi, who is also mentioned in a number of Puranas, "is regarded as one of the most learned and virtuous women of ancient India" and symbolizes intellectual women in India. A college in New Delhi is named after her, as is the Matreyi Vedic Village, a retreat location in Tamil Nadu.

References

Bibliography

External links
Maitreyi-Yajnavalkya Dialogue, 1st set Brihadaranyaka Upanishad 2.4, Max Muller (Translator)
Maitreyi-Yajnavalkya Dialogue, 2nd set Brihadaranyaka Upanishad 4.5, Max Muller (Translator)
The conversation of Yajnavalkya and Maitreyi on the absolute self, 1st set, Swami Krishnananda (Translator)

Ancient Indian philosophers
Ancient Indian writers
Hindu philosophers and theologians
Rigveda
Indian women philosophers
Ancient Indian women writers
Year of birth unknown
Year of death unknown
Women mystics
8th-century BC Hindus
8th-century BC women
8th-century BC Indian philosophers